The 2022 Los Angeles County Board of Supervisors elections took place on June 7, 2022 with runoff elections held on November 8, 2022 to elect members of the Los Angeles County Board of Supervisors. Two of the five seats on the board were up for election.
Two of the five seats of the Los Angeles County Board of Supervisors were up for election to four-year terms.

Municipal elections in California are officially nonpartisan; candidates' party affiliations do not appear on the ballot.

District 1 
 
The first supervisorial district contains Downtown, Northeast Los Angeles and Eastside Los Angeles, parts of the San Gabriel Valley, and the eastern Pomona Valley. It includes the cities of Montebello, Pomona, West Covina, El Monte and Alhambra. Incumbent supervisor Hilda Solis ran for re-election to a third term. She was re-elected in 2018 unopposed.

Candidates

Declared 
 David E. Argudo, La Puente city councilor
 Kevin Dalton, entrepreneur
 Hilda Solis, incumbent supervisor and former United States Secretary of Labor
 Tammy Solis, businesswoman
 Brian Smith

Endorsements

Results

District 3 
 
The third supervisorial district covers the western areas of the county, encapsulating the Westside, Santa Monica Mountains, and San Fernando Valley. It includes the cities of Santa Monica, West Hollywood, and Beverly Hills. Incumbent supervisor Sheila Kuehl opted not to run for a third term and had instead chosen to retire. She was re-elected in 2018 with 75.5% of the vote.

Candidates

Advanced to runoff 
 Robert Hertzberg, state senator from the 18th district and former state assemblyman from the 40th district
 Lindsey Horvath, West Hollywood city councillor and former mayor

Eliminated in primary 
 Roxanne Beckford, actress
 Craig A. Brill, canine recreational provider
 Jeffi Girgenti, small business owner
 Henry Stern, state senator from the 27th district

Withdrew 
 Richard Bloom, state assemblyman from the 50th district

Declined 
 Sheila Kuehl, Chair Pro Tem and incumbent supervisor

Endorsements

Results

References

Los Angeles County Board of Supervisors elections